Iron Chef America: Supreme Cuisine is a video game released for Nintendo DS on November 18, 2008, and for the Wii one week later.  It is based on the television series Iron Chef America and developed by American studio Black Lantern Studios, published by Destineer.

Overview

Resembling other cooking games such as Cooking Mama, Supreme Cuisine features "a series of fast-paced and intense culinary challenges" in which players either use the Wii Remote or the stylus on the DS to prepare dishes while competing against an opponent. Much like the show, players must complete between three and six dishes within a time limit, which are then judged by taste, visual appeal, and originality.

The game features a chef school for the player to practice their skills in preparing dishes, a career mode in which players progress through a number of challengers before taking on the Iron Chefs, and an instant action quick play mode. The DS version features wireless multiplayer and a single-console "Pass Play" turn-based multiplayer mode.

The game features the voice acting and likeness of Chairman Mark Dacascos, commentator Alton Brown and Iron Chefs Mario Batali, Masaharu Morimoto and Cat Cora, whom players can either play as or compete against.

Reception

The DS version of the game has received average to mixed scores, with Metacritic's median review score of 58 out of 100, and GameRankings' score of 58.33%

The Wii version of the game, however, has received mediocre to slightly unfavorable reviews, as GameRankings gave it a score of 44.50%, while Metacritic gave it a score of 42 out of 100.

References

External links
Iron Chef America: Supreme Cuisine official site

2008 video games
Wii games
Nintendo DS games
Cooking video games
Video games based on television series
Video games based on real people
Cultural depictions of cooks
Cultural depictions of American men
Cultural depictions of American women
Cultural depictions of Japanese men
Video games developed in the United States
North America-exclusive video games
Black Lantern Studios games
Multiplayer and single-player video games